Edward Lorenzio Garden (November 30, 1873 — 1936) was an American politician from Souris, North Dakota who served in the North Dakota Legislature, representing the 28th legislative district of North Dakota as a Republican. He served in the North Dakota House of Representatives from 1907 to 1910 and the North Dakota Senate from 1911 to 1914.

Early life and education
Garden was born in Decorah, Iowa on November 30, 1873. He received his education at the Decorah Institute.

Career
In 1899, Garden moved to North Dakota, where he worked as a hardware and furniture merchant, operating stores in Landa, Lansford, and Souris.

Prior to serving in the North Dakota Legislature, Garden served as vice president of the North Dakota Hardware Dealers Association and president of the Souris Commercial Club.

Garden served two terms in the North Dakota House of Representatives from 1907 to 1910, representing the 28th legislative district of North Dakota as a Republican.

In 1910, Garden was elected to one term in the North Dakota Senate. He served in this chamber from 1911 to 1914.

Personal life and death
Garden was married. He died in 1936.

References

1873 births
1936 deaths
20th-century American politicians
Republican Party North Dakota state senators
Republican Party members of the North Dakota House of Representatives
People from Bottineau County, North Dakota
People from Decorah, Iowa
Date of death missing